The discography of the Japanese duo Pink Lady consists of four studio albums, twelve compilation albums, and twenty six singles released since 1976.

Albums

Studio albums

Cover albums

Live albums

Compilations

Box sets

Soundtracks

Remix albums

Karaoke albums

Tribute albums

Singles

Japan singles

U.S. singles

Videography

Music video albums

Live video albums

Video box sets

See also 
 List of best-selling music artists in Japan

Footnotes

References

External links 
 

Discographies of Japanese artists
Pop music discographies